The Gallic Empire or the Gallic Roman Empire are names used in modern historiography for a breakaway part of the Roman Empire that functioned de facto as a separate state from 260 to 274. It originated during the Crisis of the Third Century, when a series of Roman military leaders and aristocrats declared themselves emperors and took control of Gaul and adjacent provinces without attempting to conquer Italy or otherwise seize the central Roman administrative apparatus.

The Gallic Empire was established by Postumus in 260 in the wake of barbarian invasions and instability in Rome, and at its height included the territories of Germania, Gaul, Britannia, and (for a time) Hispania. After Postumus' assassination in 269 it lost much of its territory, but continued under a number of emperors and usurpers. It was retaken by Roman emperor Aurelian after the Battle of Châlons in 274.

History

Origins
The Roman Crisis of the Third Century continued as the Emperor Valerian was defeated and captured by the Sasanian Empire of Persia in the Battle of Edessa, together with a large part of the Roman field army in the east. This left his son Gallienus in very shaky control. Shortly thereafter, the Palmyrene leader Odaenathus gained control of a wide swath of the east, including Egypt, Syria, Judea, and Arabia Petraea; while he was nominally loyal to the Roman government, his domain was de facto independent and has come to be referred to as the Palmyrene Empire.

The governors in Pannonia staged unsuccessful local revolts. The Emperor left for the Danube to attend to their disruption. This left Postumus, who was governor of Germania Superior and Inferior, in charge at the Rhine border. An exceptional administrator, Postumus had also ably protected Germania Inferior against an invasion led by the Franks in the summer of 260. In fact, Postumus defeated the Frankish forces at Empel so decisively that there would be no further Germanic raids for ten years. This all combined to make Postumus one of the most powerful men in the western reaches of the Roman Empire.

Gallienus's son Saloninus and the praetorian prefect Silvanus remained at Colonia Agrippina (Cologne), to keep the young heir out of danger and perhaps also as a check on Postumus' ambitions. Before long, however, Postumus besieged Colonia Agrippina and put the young heir and his guardian to death, making his revolt official. Postumus is thought to have established his capital there or at Augusta Treverorum (Trier). Lugdunum (Lyon) was one of the most important cities in the area under his control.

Postumus did not make any effort to extend his control into Italy or to depose Gallienus. Instead, he established parallel institutions modelled on the Roman Empire's central government: his regime had its own praetorian guard, two annually elected consuls (not all of the names have survived), and probably its own senate. According to the numismatic evidence, Postumus held the office of consul five times.

Postumus successfully fended off a military incursion by Gallienus in 263, and was never challenged by him again. However, in early 269 he was challenged by Laelianus, who was probably one of his own commanders. Laelianus was declared emperor at Mogontiacum (Mainz) by his Legio XXII Primigenia. In response, Postumus quickly retook Mogontiacum and Laelianus was killed. In the aftermath of the battle, however, Postumus was overthrown and killed by his own troops, reportedly because he did not allow them to sack the city.

After Postumus

An officer in Postumus' army, Marcus Aurelius Marius, was installed as Emperor upon Postumus's death, but died very shortly after; ancient sources writing much later state that he reigned only two days, though it is more likely, based on the numismatic record, that he reigned for a few months. Subsequently, the tribune of the praetorians, Marcus Piavonius Victorinus came to power, being recognized as Emperor in northern Gaul and Britannia, but not in Hispania. Meanwhile, Roman Emperor Gallienus had been killed in a coup in 268, and his successor in the central Roman provinces, Claudius Gothicus, re-established Roman authority in Gallia Narbonensis and parts of Gallia Aquitania; there is some evidence that the provinces of Hispania, which did not recognize Postumus's successors in Gaul, may have realigned with Rome then.

Victorinus spent most of his reign dealing with insurgencies and attempting to recover the Gaulish territories taken by Claudius Gothicus. He was assassinated in 271, but his mother Victoria took control of his troops and used her power to influence the selection of his successor. With Victoria's support, the governor of Gallia Aquitania, Gaius Pius Esuvius Tetricus was made Emperor, and was recognized in Britannia and the parts of Gaul that had recognized Victorinus. Tetricus fought off Germanic barbarians who had begun ravaging Gaul after the death of Victorinus, and was able to re-take Gallia Aquitania and western Gallia Narbonensis while Claudius Gothicus's successor Aurelian was in the east fighting the Palmyrene Empire, now in open revolt against Roman authority under Queen Zenobia. Tetricus established the imperial court at Trier, and in 273 he elevated his son, also named Tetricus, to the rank of Caesar.

The following year the younger Tetricus was made co-consul with his father, but the area under their control grew weak from internal strife, including a mutiny led by the usurper Faustinus. By that time Aurelian had defeated the Palmyrene Empire and had made plans to reconquer the west. He moved into Gaul and defeated Tetricus at the Battle of Châlons in 274. According to some sources, Tetricus offered to surrender in exchange for clemency for him and his son before the battle. This detail may be later propaganda, but either way, Aurelian was victorious, and the Gallic Empire was effectively ended. In contrast with his propaganda after the recent defeat of Zenobia, Aurelian did not present his recapture of Gaul as a victory over a foreign enemy, and indeed many officials who had served in the army and administration of the Gallic Empire continued their careers, including Tetricus, who was appointed to an administrative post in Italy.

Causes

The Gallic Empire was symptomatic of the fragmentation of power during the third-century crisis. It has also been taken to represent autonomous trends in the western provinces, including proto-feudalistic tendencies among the Gaulish land-owning class whose support has sometimes been thought to have underpinned the strength of the Gallic Empire, and an interplay between the strength of Roman institutions and the growing importance of provincial concerns.

One of Postumus' primary objectives as emperor was evidently the defense of the Germanic frontier. In 261, he repelled mixed groups of Franks and Alamanni to hold the Rhine limes secure (though lands beyond the upper Rhine and Danube had to be abandoned to the barbarians within a couple of years). In so doing, Postumus positioned himself avowedly as not only the defender and restorer of Gaul, but also as the upholder of the Roman name.

The usurpation of power over Britain and northern Gaul by Carausius just twenty years later reflects a continuing trend by which local loyalties from the landed aristocracy and deteriorating morale in the legions enabled Carausius to seize power in Britain. Similarly with the withdrawal of legions after 408, many Britons desired a localized Roman authority rather than nationalist revolt. The desire for Roman order and institutions was entirely compatible with a degree of national or regional separatism.

List of Gallic Emperors

The Gallic Emperors are known primarily from the coins they minted. The political and military history of the Gallic Empire can be sketched through the careers of these emperors. Their names are as follows:
 Postumus 260–269 
 (Laelianus 269, usurper)
 Marius 269
 Victorinus 269–270
 (Domitian II 271?, usurper)
 Tetricus the Elder 270–274
 Tetricus the Younger 270–274 (son of Tetricus; Caesar) 
 (Faustinus 274?, usurper)

Consuls of the Gallic Empire

Family tree

See also
 Roman governors of Germania Inferior
 Bagaudae
 Jublains archeological site
 Consul (Gallic Empire)

Notes

References

Bibliography

External links
 Gallic Consuls
 Gallic Empire
 Jona Lendering, "Gallic Empire"
 Gallic Empire coinage

 
260 establishments
274 disestablishments
3rd century in Roman Gaul
States and territories established in the 260s
States and territories disestablished in the 3rd century
Former empires in Europe
Crisis of the Third Century